Kahkewistahaw 72 is an Indian reserve of the Kahkewistahaw First Nation in Saskatchewan. It is 13 kilometres north of Broadview. In the 2016 Canadian Census, it recorded a population of 502 living in 146 of its 184 total private dwellings. In the same year, its Community Well-Being index was calculated at 58 of 100, compared to 58.4 for the average First Nations community and 77.5 for the average non-Indigenous community.

References

Indian reserves in Saskatchewan
Division No. 5, Saskatchewan
Kahkewistahaw First Nation